The Paraguayan football league system is a series of interconnected leagues for football clubs in Paraguay.

Overview

At the top is the Primera División or División de Honor (first division) with 12 clubs.

Below the 1st level is the Intermedia (second division).

In order to get promoted to the Intermedia there are two subdivisions at the 3rd level: the Primera División B Metropolitana, which comprises teams from the Gran Asunción area; and the Primera División B Nacional which contains the best teams from the different Departments of Paraguay.

The 4th level is similar, with the Primera División C containing only teams from the Gran Asunción area. The other subdivision is comprised by all 17 federations from each Paraguayan Department (governed by the UFI), which in turn, contain several regional leagues that cover the whole country.

2020

See also
 Football in Paraguay
 Primera División Paraguaya
 División Intermedia
 Paraguayan Tercera División
 Paraguayan Primera División B
 Primera División B Nacional
 Paraguayan Cuarta División
 Campeonato Nacional de Interligas
 Unión del Fútbol del Interior
 Paraguayan women's football championship
 Football Federation of the 1st Department Concepción
 Football Federation of the 2nd Department San Pedro
 Football Federation of the 3rd Department Cordillera
 Football Federation of the 4th Department Guairá
 Football Federation of the 5th Department Caaguazú
 Football Federation of the 6th Department Caazapá
 Football Federation of the 7th Department Itapúa
 Football Federation of the 8th Department Misiones
 Football Federation of the 9th Department Paraguarí
 Football Federation of the 10th Department Alto Paraná
 Football Federation of the 11th Department Central
 Football Federation of the 12th Department Ñeembucú
 Football Federation of the 13th Department Amambay
 Football Federation of the 14th Department Canindeyú
 Football Federation of the 15th Department Presidente Hayes
 Football Federation of the 16th Department Alto Paraguay
 Football Federation of the 17th Department Boquerón

References

 
Football league systems in South America